These are the official results of the Men's Marathon competition at the 1998 European Championships in Budapest, Hungary. The race was held on Saturday August 22, 1998. Italian runners, led by Stefano Baldini, swept the medals.

Medalists

Abbreviations
All times shown are in hours:minutes:seconds

Records

Final ranking

Marathon Cup
The team's time is given by the first three arrivals of each country, but awarded with the medal also the others athletes of the team that finished the race.

See also
 1998 European Marathon Cup

References

External links
 Results
 todor66
 marathonspiegel

Marathon, Men
Marathons at the European Athletics Championships
1998 marathons
Men's marathons
Marathons in Hungary